Dubrave may refer to:
Bosnia and Herzegovina
Dubrave, Brčko, village close to Brčko, Bosnia and Herzegovina
Dubrave, Gradiška
Dubrave, Glamoč
Dubrave, Jajce
Dubrave, Kiseljak
Dubrave, Aladinići
Dubrave, Stolac

See also
 
 Dubrava (disambiguation)